Realm of Shadows is the third studio album by American  band Midnight Syndicate, released March 6, 2000 by Entity Productions. Musically keeping with the band's blend of dark instrumental music and horror-influenced soundscape, the theme of the album centers around a cursed and abandoned village.

Album release 
The album was self-distributed in United States, selling nationally in the United States through chains like Spencer Gifts, Hot Topic, Border Book Stores. The album was also sold in amusement park gift stores at Busch Gardens Williamsburg, and in other retailers of Halloween-related products, such as Mr Fun's, a chain of costume shops based in Cuyahoga Falls, Ohio.

Reception 
Realm of Shadows, along with their previous release, Born of the Night, helped establish the band's reputation in the haunted attraction and gothic music industries. In an October 2000 interview in The Plain Dealer, band founder, Edward Douglas estimated that about 400 haunted houses and amusement parks were using the music including Cedar Point and Busch Gardens Tampa. In an article in Cleveland Magazine Adrian LePeltier, Director of Show Development at Universal Florida, called the music "the most horrifying he'd ever heard," convincing him to use it in the park's Halloween Horror Nights event. Daniel Hinds of Outburn Magazine said the album "took the band's brand of symphonic horror to a new level," commenting on that the ambient, synth-based instrumentals were a more subtle type of "terror." Side-Line Music Magazine praised the dark tone of album's music created and effectiveness of the artwork. Realm of Shadows, along with Born of the Night, was used as pre-show music for King Diamond's tour in 2000.

Track listing

Personnel 
Edward Douglas – composer
Gavin Goszka – composer
Tim Blue - composer on Among the Ruins
Joseph Vargo - narration on Prophecy

Production 
Mixed and Engineered by Tim Blue (assisted by Edward Douglas and Gavin Goszka)
Artwork by Joseph Vargo for Monolith Graphics
Photography and Design by Christine Filipak
Additional Photography by Colleen Douglas
Financial Consultant: Edward P. Douglas
Mixed at Mandala Studios
Mastered at Beachwood Studios

References 

2000 albums
Midnight Syndicate albums